The Kuznetsov NK-25 is a turbofan aircraft engine used in the Tupolev Tu-22M strategic bomber. It can equal the NK-321 engine as one of the most powerful supersonic engines in service today. It is rated at  thrust. The three shaft engine we call the NK-25 was designed in the years 1972–1974. It is made by the Soviet Kuznetsov Design Bureau.

Applications
 Tupolev Tu-142LL (testbed)
 Tupolev Tu-22M3
 Tupolev Tu-22MR

Specifications (NK-25)

See also

References

External links
 NK-25 on LeteckeMotory.cz (Czech)

Low-bypass turbofan engines
1970s turbofan engines
Kuznetsov aircraft engines
Three-spool turbofan engines